Caroline Baldin (born 14 March 1993) is a French ice hockey player for the ZSC Lions and the French national team.

She represented France at the 2019 IIHF Women's World Championship.

References

External links

1993 births
Living people
French expatriate ice hockey people
French expatriate sportspeople in Switzerland
French women's ice hockey goaltenders
People from Saint-Martin-d'Hères
Montreal Carabins women's ice hockey players
Sportspeople from Isère